Victor John Mature (January 29, 1913 – August 4, 1999) was an American stage, film, and television actor who was a leading man in Hollywood during the 1940s and 1950s. His best known film roles include One Million B.C. (1940), My Darling Clementine (1946), Kiss of Death (1947), Samson and Delilah (1949), and The Robe (1953). He also appeared in many musicals opposite such stars as Rita Hayworth and Betty Grable.

Early life
Mature was born in Louisville, Kentucky. His father, Marcello Gelindo Maturi, later Marcellus George Mature, was a cutler and knife sharpener from Pinzolo, in the Italian part of the former County of Tyrol (now Trentino in Italy, but at that time part of the Austro-Hungarian Empire). His mother, Clara P. (Ackley), was Kentucky-born and of Swiss heritage. An older brother, Marcellus Paul Mature, died of osteomyelitis in 1918 at age 11. His only sister, Isabelle, born and died in 1906. Victor attended St. Xavier High School in Louisville, Kentucky, the Kentucky Military Institute, and the Spencerian Business School. He briefly sold candy and operated a restaurant before moving to California.

Career

Pasadena Playhouse
Mature studied and acted at the Pasadena Community Playhouse. For three years, he lived in a tent in the back yard of Mrs Willigan, the mother of a fellow student, Catherine Lewis. He was spotted by Charles R. Rogers, an agent for Hal Roach, while acting in a production of To Quito and Back. Rogers called him "a rival to Clark Gable, Robert Taylor and Errol Flynn." Mature signed a seven-year contract with Roach in September 1939.

Hal Roach
Roach cast Mature in a small role in The Housekeeper's Daughter (1939), for which one reviewer called him "a handsome Tarzan type".  Roach then gave Mature his first leading role, as a fur-clad caveman in One Million B.C. (1940). The film was highly publicized and it raised Mature's profile; Hedda Hopper called him "a sort of miniature Johnny Weissmuller".  Roach next put him in a swashbuckler set during the War of 1812, Captain Caution (1940).

As Hal Roach only made a handful of movies every year, he loaned out Mature's services to RKO, who used him as a leading man in the Anna Neagle–Herbert Wilcox musical, No, No, Nanette. The studio people were so pleased with his performance, they bought an option to take over half of Mature's contract with Hal Roach, enabling them to draw on his services for two films a year over three years. Wilcox wanted to reunite Mature with Neagle in Sunny. Roach announced Mature would support Victor McLaglen in Broadway Limited, but Mature was not cast in the final film.

Lady in the Dark
Mature was worried about the direction of his career at this stage, claiming, "nobody was going to believe I could do anything except grunt and groan." So he went to New York City to try the theatre. He signed to appear in a play with the Group Theatre, Retreat to Pleasure by Irwin Shaw. Shortly afterward it was announced he would appear instead in the musical Lady in the Dark with a book by Moss Hart and songs from Ira Gershwin and Kurt Weill; Mature played Randy Curtis, a film star boyfriend of the show's protagonist, magazine editor Liza Elliott (Gertrude Lawrence). Mature later described his role:

First, this secretary came out saying 'What a beautiful hunk of man!' Then Danny Kaye topped that with a long, long introductory number. Finally, I made my entrance. John Barrymore told me I was the only person who could have followed up on all that.

The musical debuted on Broadway in January 1941 and was a smash hit, making a star of Danny Kaye and Macdonald Carey, and causing fresh appreciation for Mature's talents. His performance was well received, Brooks Atkinson of The New York Times calling him "unobjectionably handsome and affable". The description of Randy Curtis in the musical – "Beautiful Hunk of Man" – would be frequently used to describe Mature throughout his career. Mature missed some of the run due to an emergency appendectomy, but played the role until June.

20th Century Fox
When Mature left Lady in the Dark, he announced that 20th Century Fox had bought out half of Mature's contract with Hal Roach. His first film under the contract was to be Bowery Nightingale with Alice Faye. He was going to follow this with The Shanghai Gesture for Arnold Pressburger and Josef von Sternberg at United Artists.

Bowery Nightingale was not made, so Fox instead assigned Mature to appear in a thriller with Faye, I Wake Up Screaming (which had a working title of Hot Spot); Faye ended up being replaced with Betty Grable. Filming of The Shanghai Gesture was postponed to enable Mature to finish Screaming, which was a popular success. The Shanghai Gesture also proved popular.

Mature was announced for a Fox musical, Highway to Hell, which ended up being postponed; instead, he replaced John Payne in a Betty Grable musical, Song of the Islands (Mature was replaced in turn on Highway by Cesar Romero).

Mature was paid $450 a week under his contract with Roach for Shanghai Gesture, but Roach received $3750 a week for Mature's services. Roach received $22,000 for Mature in Song of the Islands, but Mature was paid $4,000. He asked for a pay increase of $1,250 a week.

RKO wanted Mature for Passage to Bordeaux and Josef Von Sternberg wanted him for Lady Paname. Instead, Mature made another musical for Fox, supporting Rita Hayworth in My Gal Sal (a role originally meant for Don Ameche).

In November 1941, Fox bought out the four years remaining on Mature's contract with Hal Roach for $80,000. (This included loan out provisions to RKO.) Roach had not wanted to sell, but he was in financial difficulties and his backers insisted. Mature would be paid $1,500 a week. He had also had six commitments with RKO. "The studio [Fox] will have to make a success of me," said Mature.

"I wasn't pampered the way a Tyrone Power was," Mature recalled later of his time at Fox. "Zanuck would say, 'If you're not careful, I'll give you Mature for your next picture'."

Fox talked of reuniting Hayworth and Mature in a Russian set war film Ski Patrol. Instead, Mature was lent to RKO for a musical with Lucille Ball, Seven Days' Leave. This was followed by Footlight Serenade with Grable and Payne. All these films were very popular at the box office.

World War II

In July 1942, Mature attempted to enlist in the U.S. Navy, but was rejected for color blindness. He enlisted in the U.S. Coast Guard after taking a different eye test the same day. This meant that when Paramount filmed Lady in the Dark, Mature was unable to reprise his stage role. After 14 months aboard Storis, Mature was promoted to the rating of chief boatswain's mate.

In 1944, he did a series of War Bond tours and acted in morale shows.  He assisted Coast Guard recruiting efforts by being a featured player in the musical revue Tars and Spars, which opened in Miami, Florida, in April 1944 and toured the United States for the next year. In May 1945, Mature was reassigned to the Coast Guard manned troop transport , which was involved in transferring troops to the Pacific Theater. Mature was honorably discharged from the Coast Guard in November 1945 and he resumed his acting career.

Resumption of career

Fox assigned Mature to Three Little Girls in Blue. He was pulled off that film to play Philip Marlowe in an adaptation of The High Window. In December 1945 he signed a new two-year contract with Fox. However Mature ended up withdrawing from that film and instead was cast by John Ford in My Darling Clementine, playing Doc Holliday opposite Henry Fonda's Wyatt Earp, considered to be one of his finest performances. The film was produced by 20th Century Fox, whose head of production Darryl F. Zanuck was delighted that Ford wanted to use Mature, telling the director:

Zanuck promised Mature he would keep him away from musicals and stuck to that, casting him in the period thriller Moss Rose; Mature received a $50,000 bonus after shooting completed. His next film was the film noir, Kiss of Death, which had been developed specifically as a vehicle for him. The movie, shot mostly on location in New York, was not a particularly big hit, but was popular, earned Mature some of his best reviews and turned Richard Widmark into a star.

Still at Fox, Mature made his second Western, Fury at Furnace Creek, replacing John Payne. That film co-starred Coleen Gray, who had been in Kiss of Death and Fox announced plans to team them for a third time in a remake of Seventh Heaven. However, the film was not made. Instead, he co-starred with Richard Conte in a thriller directed by Robert Siodmak, Cry of the City. Mature's performance in the film as a world-weary cop was widely praised; one reviewer noted that he "turns in an excellent performance, arguably the best of his career".

Mature still had an obligation to make a movie at RKO, which dated from before the war. He was announced for Battleground and before eventually being cast in a serious drama about football, Interference, which became Easy Living in 1949, with Lucille Ball.

Samson and Delilah

Mature's career received a massive lift when he was borrowed by Cecil B. DeMille at Paramount to play the lead in the $3.5 million biblical spectacular Samson and Delilah. De Mille described the role of Samson as “a combination Tarzan, Robin Hood, and Superman.” Mature was reluctant to take the role at first out of fear of risking his new postwar reputation as a serious actor, but he changed his mind.

During filming, Mature was frightened by a number of the animals and mechanical props used in the production, including the lions, the wind machine, the swords and even the water.  This infuriated the director, DeMille, who bellowed through his megaphone at the assembled cast and crew:  “I have met a few men in my time. Some have been afraid of heights, some have been afraid of water, some have been afraid of fire, some have been afraid of closed spaces. Some have even been afraid of open spaces – or themselves. But in all my 35 years of picture-making experience, Mr. Mature, I have not until now met a man who was 100 percent yellow.”

While Samson was in postproduction, Paramount used Mature in another film, co-starring with Betty Hutton in Red, Hot and Blue, his first musical in a number of years. It was not particularly popular, and Easy Living was a flop, but Samson and Delilah earned over $12 million during its original run, making it the most popular movie of the 1940s, and responsible for ushering in a cycle of spectacles set in the Ancient World.

Mature returned to Fox and was put in a popular musical with Betty Grable, Wabash Avenue. It was directed by Henry Koster who recalled Mature was "nice to work with, amusing. He very much looked out for his money always."

RKO

In late 1949, Mature was meant to fulfill another commitment at RKO, Alias Mike Fury (the new title for Mr Whiskers). Mature refused to make the movie and was put on suspension by Fox. The script was rewritten and Mature ended up making the film, which was retitled Gambling House.

Back at Fox, he supported Ann Sheridan in a comedy, Stella. In 1949, he was directed by Jacques Tourneur in Easy Living.

In September 1950, he was making a film in Montana about fire fighters, Wild Winds, for Fox with John Lund. Mature injured himself in a motorcycle accident . After Lund was stung by a wasp and the location was snowed in, it was decided to abandon the film. (It was later filmed with new stars as Red Skies of Montana.)

Mature took a number of months off, before returning to filmmaking with The Las Vegas Story, with Jane Russell at RKO. RKO released – but did not produce – Mature's next film, Androcles and the Lion, an adaptation of the play by George Bernard Shaw with Mature as a Roman centurion. Like Las Vegas Story, it was a box-office failure.

Far more popular was a musical he made at MGM, Million Dollar Mermaid with Esther Williams, a biopic of Annette Kellermann, playing Kellermann's promoter husband. According to Williams's autobiography, she and Mature had a romantic relationship.

Back at Fox, Mature was meant to be reteamed with Betty Grable in a musical, The Farmer Takes a Wife, but the studio instead reassigned him to a comedy with Patricia Neal, Something for the Birds.

Back at RKO, Mature was meant to star in Split Second, but instead was reteamed with Jean Simmons in the romantic drama Affair with a Stranger. RKO still wanted him for Split Second, but instead Fox put him in a Korean war film, The Glory Brigade.

He followed this with a movie at Universal, The Veils of Bagdad. The release of this was held up until after that of Mature's next film, The Robe.

The Robe

The Robe had been in development in Hollywood for over a decade. In December 1952, Mature signed to play Demetrius in two movies, The Robe and a sequel, Demetrius and the Gladiators. The films were shot consecutively.

The Robe, the first CinemaScope movie to be released (ahead of How to Marry a Millionaire, which was actually the first film shot in the new process), was an enormous success, one of the most popular movies of all time. Veils of Bagdad was not as popular, but Demetrius and the Gladiators was another hit.

Back at RKO, Mature made Dangerous Mission for producer Irwin Allen. He travelled to Holland in September 1953 to support Clark Gable and Lana Turner in a World War Two film made at MGM, Betrayed, another popular success.

Fox put Mature into another ancient history spectacle, The Egyptian. He was originally meant to co-star with Marlon Brando and Kirk Douglas. Mature renewed his contract with Fox for another year, his 12th at that studio. The Egyptian ended up starring Mature with Edmund Purdom and Michael Wilding, plus Bella Darvi; it was a box-office disappointment.

Mature went over to Universal to play the title role in Chief Crazy Horse, in exchange for a fee and a percentage of the profits.

End of contract with Fox
Fox wanted Mature to support Tyrone Power and Susan Hayward in Untamed (1955), but Mature refused, claiming he had worked for two years and wanted a vacation. The studio replaced him with Richard Egan and put him under what they called a "friendly" suspension.

In 1954, Mature signed a two-picture deal with Columbia Pictures, giving him script and co-star approval, at $200,000 a film. The first movie he made under this contract was The Last Frontier (1955).

Before he started making that, however, he was called back to Fox to appear in the heist thriller, Violent Saturday. This was the last movie he made at Fox.

United Artists and Warwick Productions
In March 1955, while making Last Frontier, Mature announced he had also signed a contract with United Artists for them to finance and distribute six films over five years for Mature's own company.

In May 1955, Mature signed a two-picture contract with Warwick Productions. Warwick was an English company which had success making films aimed at the international market with American stars; they released their films in the USA through Columbia Pictures. The first of Mature's films for Warwick was to be Zarak. He ended up making Safari beforehand, a tale of the Mau Mau with location filming in Kenya. Both Safari and Zarak were successful.

Sam Goldwyn, Jr, hired him to make The Sharkfighters, released through United Artists and shot on location in Cuba. He was back with Warwick for Interpol, reteaming him with his Zarak co-star, Anita Ekberg, filmed throughout Europe. In London, he made The Long Haul, a truck-driving drama with Diana Dors, the second film under his deal with Columbia.

Mature finally made a movie for his own production company, Romina Productions, in conjunction with United Artists and Batjac Productions: China Doll, directed by Frank Borzage, with whom Mature co-produced. Mature and Borzage announced they would also make The Incorrigibles and Vaults of Heaven.

Mature signed to make two more films with Warwick Productions, No Time to Die (Tank Force) and The Man Inside. He ended up only making the first, a World War Two film with Libyan locations; Jack Palance took his role in The Man Inside.

Mature made another movie for Romina and Batjac, a Western, Escort West. It was released by United Artists, which also distributed Timbuktu, a French Foreign Legion adventure tale that Mature made for producer Edward Small and the director Jacques Tourneur.

Mature was reunited with producer Irwin Allen for The Big Circus, shot in early 1959. He then made his second film for Warwick under his two-picture contract with them, The Bandit of Zhobe, following this with an Italian peplum, aka "sword-and-sandal" movie, Hannibal, with Mature in the title role. It was shot in Italy, as was The Tartars with Orson Welles. Mature then retired from acting.

In a 1978 interview, Mature said of his decision to retire from acting at age 46: "It wasn't fun anymore. "I was OK financially so I thought what the hell – I'll become a professional loafer."

Retirement
After five years of retirement, he was lured back into acting by the opportunity to parody himself in After the Fox (1966), co-written by Neil Simon. Mature played "Tony Powell", an aging American actor who is living off his reputation from his earlier body of work. In a similar vein in 1968, he played a giant, The Big Victor, in Head, a movie starring The Monkees. Mature enjoyed the script while admitting it made no sense to him, saying "All I know is it makes me laugh."

Mature was famously self-deprecatory about his acting skills. Once, after being rejected for membership in a country club because he was an actor, he cracked, "I'm not an actor — and I've got 64 films to prove it!" He was quoted in 1968 on his acting career: "Actually, I am a golfer. That is my real occupation. I never was an actor. Ask anybody, particularly the critics."

He came out of retirement again in 1971 to star in Every Little Crook and Nanny and again in 1976 along with many other former Hollywood stars in Won Ton Ton, the Dog Who Saved Hollywood. His last feature film appearance was a cameo as a millionaire in Firepower in 1979, while his final acting role was that of Samson's father Manoah in the TV movie Samson and Delilah in 1984. In a 1971 interview, Mature quipped about his decision to retire:

I was never that crazy about acting. I had a compulsion to earn money, not to act. So, I worked as an actor until I could afford to retire. I wanted to quit while I could still enjoy life ... I like to loaf. Everyone told me I would go crazy or die if I quit working. Yeah? Well, what a lovely way to die.

In 1980, he said he was "pretty proud of about 50% of my motion pictures. Demetrius and the Gladiators wasn't bad. The Robe and Samson and Delilah weren't bad. I made 72 of them and I made close to $18 million. So what the hell." He said in the same interview his favorite actors were Al Pacino, Dustin Hoffman, and especially Burt Reynolds.

Personal life
Mature was married five times.
 Frances Charles (1938–1940, annulled)
 Martha Stephenson Kemp, the widow of bandleader Hal Kemp, (1941–1943, divorced)
 Dorothy Stanford Berry (1948–1955, divorced) 
 Adrienne Joy Urwick (1959–1969, divorced)
 Loretta Gaye Sebena,  an opera singer (1974 until his death) – with whom he had his only child, daughter Victoria (born 1975). Victoria became an opera singer like her mother.
He was also engaged to Rita Hayworth, before she married Orson Welles, and to Anne Shirley.

Death

Mature died of leukemia in 1999 at his Rancho Santa Fe, California, home, at the age of 86. He was buried in the family plot, marked by a replica of the Angel of Grief, at St. Michael's Cemetery in his hometown of Louisville.

For his contribution to the motion picture industry, Mature has a star on the Hollywood Walk of Fame located at 6780 Hollywood Boulevard.

Critical appraisal
David Thomson wrote a critical appraisal of Mature in his book The New Biographical Dictionary of Film:

Mature is an uninhibited creature of the naive. Simple, crude, and heady – like ketchup or treacle – he is a diet scorned by the knowing, but obsessive if succumbed to in error. It is too easy to dismiss Mature, for he surpasses badness. He is a strong man in a land of hundred pound weaklings, an incredible concoction of beef steak, husky voice, and brilliantine – a barely concealed sexual advertisement for soiled goods. Remarkably, he is as much himself in the cheerfully meretricious and the pretentiously serious. Such a career has no more pattern than a large ham; it slices consistently forever. The more lurid or distasteful the art the better Mature comes across.

Filmography

Theatre credits
 Back to Methuselah by George Bernard Shaw – Pasadena Playhouse, August 1938
 Autumn Crocus – Pasadena Playhouse September–October 1938
 Paradise Plantation – Pasadena Playhouse November 1938
 To Quito and Back by Ben Hecht – Pasadena Playhouse April 1939
 Lady in the Dark – Alvin Theatre, Jan–June 1941

Radio appearances

References in popular culture
In 1985, at the Uptown Lounge in Athens, Georgia, R.E.M. performed under the pseudonym Hornets Attack Victor Mature. "We sent a press release that said it was a combination of Jerry Lee Lewis and Joy Division," explained Peter Buck. "God knows how we got a date, but we did." The name was used after Buck spotted it in a 'Name Your Band' article in Trouser Press. It told of a Los Angeles band who had taken their name from a newspaper headline describing an incident where furious wasps had ganged up on the actor during a round of golf. The band had since opted for something a little more West Coast, so Buck considered Hornets Attack Victor Mature to be fair game. "I figured anyone who'd pay money to see a band with a name that silly is our kind of person."

See also
 List of people from the Louisville metropolitan area

References

Further reading
 McKay, James. The Films of Victor Mature (McFarland, 2012).

External links

 
 
 Photos of Victor Mature in The Shanghai Gesture by Ned Scott
 Mature's Matinee – The Victor Mature Fan Club and Website

1913 births
1999 deaths
20th Century Studios contract players
20th-century American male actors
American male film actors
American male radio actors
American male stage actors
American male television actors
American people of Italian descent
American people of Swiss descent
Burials in Kentucky
California Republicans
Deaths from cancer in California
Deaths from leukemia
Male actors from Louisville, Kentucky
People from Rancho Santa Fe, California
Radio personalities from Louisville, Kentucky
St. Xavier High School (Louisville) alumni
United States Coast Guard non-commissioned officers
United States Coast Guard personnel of World War II